List of historical monuments in Ireland may refer to:
 List of castles in Ireland
 List of historic houses in the Republic of Ireland
 List of megalithic monuments in Ireland
 List of monastic houses in Ireland
 List of National Monuments of Ireland
 List of World Heritage Sites in the Republic of Ireland